Artspace is a contemporary art gallery and non-profit organization located in downtown New Haven, Connecticut. Artspace presents gallery exhibitions, outdoor installations, a major annual Open Studios festival, and a teen education program. Artspace has been recognized for its artistic merit by the National Endowment for the Arts, the LEF Foundation, and the Tremaine and Warhol foundations. The Artspace gallery, located at 50 Orange St., New Haven, houses  of a storefront in the Ninth Square neighborhood for exhibitions, workshops, and staff offices.

History

Artspace was conceived as early as 1984, by a group of New Haven-based visual and performing artists in response to the elimination of a promised gallery space dedicated to local artists in the Shubert, a prominent local theater.  The name Artspace originally described the permanent space and black box reserved for local artists and performers that were promised but never delivered by the Shubert.  In its next incarnation without a permanent home, the name became an umbrella for a variety of projects.  Its artistic leaders found spaces as "art spaces," including factory buildings (former manufacturers of tires, rifles, corsets, cash registers, and Erector Sets), public libraries, public schools, public greenways, city buses, and old malls and storefronts.

Officially starting in 1987, it operated an exhibition and performance space in a new facility which it purchased and helped build at 70 Audubon Street, in the emerging Audubon arts district downtown.  More than 120 major exhibitions were organized, many addressing social issues relevant to New Haven's urban community.  Programs included an annual small theater festival, monthly showcases of musicians, poets, and performance artists, and a jazz series, which evolved into the region's first jazz non-profit organization, JazzHaven. The Summer Arts for Youth (SAY!) Mentoring Program for inner city youth paired local artists with high school students for a summer apprenticeship and exhibition. In 1998, the Artspace Board determined that the organization could more effectively reach the constituency it was intended to serve if relieved of the substantial costs of carrying prime New Haven real estate.  The Board approved a plan to restore the financial stability of the organization and voted to sell the gallery and performance space to the Educational Center for the Arts.  Until 2002, Artspace was again without a home.  Now, it is back in a gallery space under a city subsidy.

In 2001, Artspace entered into a collaborative arrangement with the City of New Haven and jointly redeveloped a civil-war era furniture factory located in a historic but overlooked area of downtown. With the support of CT's Department of Economic Development, the New Haven Development Commission, and the City's Planning Commission, Artspace oversaw the renovation and creation of a flexible exhibition facility which includes areas for group exhibitions, experimental solo space, window installations, as well as an area for an artist in residence and Artspace's offices. Artspace's Center for Contemporary Art (“Artspace”) opened in April 2002, drawing both crowds and interest, and serving as an effective good-will ambassador for downtown New Haven.  In 2004, Artspace also entered into a lease and agreement to develop the Lot, an outdoor space one block from its gallery, as a site for temporary public sculpture.

Artspace presents thematic group exhibitions, solo exhibitions in the Project Room, and selections from the Flatfile, a semi-permanent collection of 300 works-on-paper by area artists chosen from a bi-annual open call. The Lot installation rotates twice a year. Artspace runs a lively education program aimed at public schools students from New Haven, encompassing a docent program, a hands-on summer apprenticeship for 15 students to collaborate on a new work with a visiting artist, and vacation period printmaking and photography workshops. These programs are all offered at no charge to students.  Each year, Artspace also presents City-Wide Open Studios, a month-long festival. Artists open their studios, and Artspace activates empty buildings as sites for temporary installations. A central exhibition at Artspace is mounted with one representative work by every artist.

Notable Exhibitions

Arresting Patterns: Race and the Criminal Justice System
This major exhibition featured a group of artists whose work illuminates the often-overlooked systematic patterns of bias in the American criminal justice system. The artworks focused on repetition and replication to illustrate patterns of discrimination and stereotyping leading to mass incarceration, pointing to an urgent need for sentencing reform.

Artspace worked in collaboration with New Haven-based painter Titus Kaphar to develop the historical, educational, and curatorial aspects of the show.  The basis of “Arresting Patterns” was inspired by the themes of Kaphar's series “The Jerome Project”. “The Jerome Project”  started when Kaphar searched the name of his father within the U.S prison system and found 99 incarcerated African American men with the same name. To respond to this stark visual example of the mass incarceration of black men, Kaphar recreated the mugshots of these men in the Byzantine icon style of Saint Jerome. “Arresting Patterns” included work by Jamal Cyrus, Maria Gaspar, Lauri Jo Reynolds, Dread Scott, Iyaba Ibo Mandingo, Adrian Piper, and Andy Warhol. A New Haven adaptation of the Jerome Project featured works from eighteen high school students from New Haven Public Schools who also collaborated with Kaphar and theater artists Dexter Singleton and Aaron Jafferis on a performance element.

In September 2015, Artspace and the Yale University Art Gallery presented the “Arresting Patterns” conference to accompany the exhibit. The conference was intended to promote discussion on the intersection between of race, criminal justice, artistic expression, and community. It included artists, policymakers, scholars, and activists who sought to address the questions presented in the gallery exhibit. The conference included a series of five panels in which speakers explored many aspects of the effects of incarceration and racial profiling in America.

From April 21, 2015 to September 11, 2016 “Arresting Patterns” moved to the African American Museum in Philadelphia. The exhibit expanded to include the work of artists, Felandus Thames, Martine Syms, and Avtomat Kalashnikova. Public programs such as a town hall and an open house occurred in Philadelphia. The exhibit also served as the backdrop for the Black Congressional Caucus convening at the 2016 Democratic Convention.

Forced Collaboration II
This exhibition (May 10 - June 28, 2014) pairs 12 artists (6 collaborations) with wildly different practices. The artists are strangers to each other, selected by the curator (Jacob Rhodes) to exchange a finished work and to re-create that work by forcing themselves on it in any way they please. No preconceptions stain their attempts; no obligations of friendship or acquaintance constrain what they can or cannot do.

Featured artists: Chris Bors, Daniel Bozhkov, Ilana Harris-Babou, Kerry Cox, Oliver Herring, David Humphrey, Bridget Mullen, Mariah Robertson, Mandolyn Wilson Rosen, Jen Schwarting, Mark Starling, and J.R. Uretsky.

50,000 Beds
In 2007, Chris Doyle, a multidisciplinary artist based in Brooklyn New York, challenged 45 artists to explore 45 rooms in hotels across the state of Connecticut.  The result was a three-part, contemporaneous exhibition in Connecticut's premier contemporary art exhibition spaces: Artspace, The Aldrich Contemporary Art Museum in Ridgefield, and Real Art Ways of Hartford.

50,000 is the approximate number of beds available to travelers in hotels, motels, and inns across Connecticut.  Artists created short videos focusing on these rooms as sites filled with narrative potential.  Familiar yet foreign, a hotel room combines experience of both intimacy and anonymity.  The finished works, from fiction to documentary to a consideration of the relationship between travelers and hotel laborers, displayed a diverse range of artistic responses and themes.

101 Dresses
Artspace paid tribute in 2007 to local children's author and West Haven librarian Eleanor Estes.   This exhibition featured 101+ pieces reflecting ideas of fashion in all media, including painting, sculpture, photography, digital art, and narrative texts. Contributors included local and national visual artists, fashion designers, and collectors.

Co-curated by Linda Lindroth and Denise Markonish, the exhibition opened on what would have been Estes's 101st birthday.  Estes wrote award-winning children's books such as Ginger Pye and The Moffats, and the inspiration for the exhibition, The Hundred Dresses.  This bestselling children's book is a perfect example of how fashion inspires art, and the group of contributors extended that inspiration to explore and examine the countless other ways in which fashions tells stories of its own.

Sixty artists contributed to the exhibition including Mimi Smith, Zac Posen, William Steig, Maira Kalman, Yoko Ono, Laurie Simmons, Barbara Morgan, Robert Taplin, J. Morgan Puett, Rachel Vaters-Carr and Andy Warhol. One of Louis Slobodkin’s original illustrations from Estes's book and an exact duplicate of Emily Dickinson's dress from the Emily Dickinson Homestead and Museum were also on view.

Factory Direct
In 2004, Artspace curator Denise Markonish sought to explore the intersection of art and industry.  Inspired by an exhibition organized at the Art Center for the Capital Region in Troy, NY, Denise worked with local artists, New Haven's Chamber of Commerce, and the Manufacturer's Association to unite artists with factories in the greater New Haven area for a 1–3-month residency.  During this time, artists and factory workers collaborated to explore how artists and factories share concerns for creativity, innovation, and problem solving.

The end result was Factory Direct: New Haven, an exhibition of artwork that captured the history, community, materials, processes, and products of the host factories through sound, images, video, and interactive installations.

City-Wide Open Studios

New Haven's City-Wide Open Studios, founded by Marianne Bernstein, Helen Kauder, and Linn Meyers, is an annual celebration of contemporary art.

CWOS aims to:
1)	Connect visual artists to the public and each other
2)	Provide a forum for showing and selling artwork that is open to all artists
3)	Foster community pride in visual artists and their contributions to a thriving city
4)	Draw thousands of visitors from New York, Connecticut, Massachusetts, and beyond to explore all that New Haven has to offer
5)	Showcase vacant historic properties by using them as exhibition space, contributing to their revitalization for other uses

This three-weekend event includes a main hub exhibition featuring a representative work by each participating artist at Artspace's gallery on Orange Street; a weekend devoted to the studios at Erector Square, site of what was once the factory making Erector Sets; a private gallery weekend complete with bike tours and guided bus tours; and, finally, the unique factor that makes CWOS stand apart from all open studios festivals, the Alternative Space weekend.  At the “AltSpace,” artists without access to a studio as well as artists from elsewhere in Connecticut show their work in a vacant historic properties that Artspace adapts into exhibition spaces, aiding in their redevelopment. Past spaces have included the Olin Metals Research Laboratory, the Pirelli Building, and the former Hamden Middle School.  Through the Alternative Space project, CWOS connects artists and the public with different neighborhoods of New Haven every year. The site for 2010's CWOS was a vacant downtown strip mall and mid-century office building, currently being redeveloped by the COOP Center for Creativity. Since then, Alternative Space locations have included the former New Haven Register building (2012), and the Goffe Street Amory (2013-2017). In October 2018, Alternative Space weekend will take place at Yale West Campus.

 “No other cultural event... brings the city so close together and involves the city so intensely.” - The New Haven Advocate

Teen Program

Artspace's education program has, since 2001, encompassed:

 An intensive summer apprenticeship program in which a master artist works with 12-15 students from city public high schools to create new work around a particular topic or methodology
 In-school residencies in which emerging artists collaborate with groups of high school students
 An after-school photography program, based on the award-winning Literacy Through Photography (LTP) Program. Artspace piloted the program in Fall 2002 with the help of LTP founder Wendy Ewald, in partnership with Leadership, Education, Athletics in Partnership (LEAP)
 An after-school teen docent program, training students to serve as exhibition guides and young curators.

Each initiative culminates in a month-long public exhibition, and is complemented by related gallery talks, poetry readings, and award receptions. Teens receive annotated portfolios of their work to use for school and job applications.

The Summer Apprenticeship Program (SAP) is the centerpiece of Artspace's work with young people and offers a unique opportunity for a small group of New Haven public high school students to work intensely with a master artist for three weeks each summer. In 2001, the program's founding year, Artspace partnered with famed Connecticut artist Sol LeWitt to create a series of wall drawings. The work, conceived by LeWitt and realized by the teen Summer Apprentices, was displayed at Artspace's gallery that summer. Artspace's 2017 Summer Apprenticeship Program featured photographer Nona Faustine who worked with students to produce self-portraiture communicating the times we've found ourselves in now. The 2018 Summer Apprenticeship Program will feature potter Roberto Lugo who will teach students how to create ceramic works with strong social messages.

Past SAP projects:
 2001: Wall Drawings with Sol LeWitt
 2002: On the Day I Was Born with David Pease 
 2003: View From Here with Lee Boronson 
 2004: The Ball Project with Danny O 
 2005: Organic Bending with Shih-Chieh Huang 
 2006: Ensemble with Jean Shin
 2007: Victim with Larissa Hall 
 2008: Hawaii with William Downs
 2009: Babel Collections with Carolyn Salas 
 2010: Tag and Repeat x 2 with Cat Balco 
 2011: Trellised Bench with Boris Chesakov and Ryan Wolfe 
 2012: Occupy Main Street with Felandus Thames
 2012: (Art)iculate alumni show
 2013: Pop & Op with Erika Van Natta
 2014: Mobile Museum of American Artifacts with Laurelin Kruse 
 2015: Arresting Patterns with Titus Kaphar, Aaron Jafferis, and Dexter Singleton
 2016: Stages of Kingdom and Exile with Wardell Milan
 2017: Masturbartory Delusions with lead artist Nona Faustine
 2018: Paying Homage: Soil and Site with Roberto Lugo
 2019: The Sound We See: A New Haven City Symphony with Paolo Davanzo and Lisa Marr of the Echo Park Film Center

The Lot

The Lot is Artspace's pocket park and public art space. It is located near Artspace at 812 Chapel Street, the site of a busy bus stop. Artspace has presented temporary art installations here since 1999, and redeveloped it as a dedicated art space in 2005 in collaboration with local and federal agencies.

The site is a square of about 90 x , facing Chapel Street, with a short side passage connecting to Orange Street. The site is bordered by the sides of neighboring buildings. Around the site's perimeter, seven  rigger poles support lighting and hanging hardware for artwork. The Lot is not gated; it is accessible to the public 24 hours a day.

Early history
The Lot began as an empty lot. It was formerly the site of the Phoenix Building, designed by Henry Austin, architect of the Grove Street Cemetery gates and New Haven City Hall. The building was torn down in the late 1990s because of safety concerns, leaving a rubble-filled lot.

In 1999, Marianne Bernstein, the chair of Artspace's Visual Arts Committee and founder of Artspace's untitled(space) gallery, recognized the potential of this lot as a site for public art. She asked Mayor DeStefano for permission and organized the inaugural project in the Lot, "New Haven Labyrinth."  A team of local artists led by Sharon Kurland created a maze, inspired by a Cretan labyrinth, made out of local river rocks painted by over 2500 local residents. In the two years that followed, Artspace continued to organize exhibitions in the Lot, including Line, a large group sculpture show curated by Deborah Hesse, and 365 Bales by Stephen Grossman. The latter installation, made of 365 fresh bales of hay, was deemed too "incendiary" by the Fire Marshall and was relocated to a field in Bethany, CT.

Renovations
In 2001, a community charrette focused on the Lot was organized by Artspace, the International Festival of Arts and Ideas and Project for Public Spaces. There, artists and neighborhood residents developed ideas for renovating the site, including plantings, pathways, benches, and a new bus shelter. To realize the plan, Artspace worked with Bothwell Site Design, the Greater New Haven Transit District, the Town Green Special Services District, and the City of New Haven, with support from the Federal Transit Administration. Bothwell's design, anchored by benches of stone recycled from the Phoenix Building, was honored by the American Society of Landscape Architects.

Exhibitions
When renovations were completed in 2005, Artspace announced an open call for proposals for temporary public art projects that would harmonize with the Lot's new function as an inviting space for residents, pedestrians, and bus riders to interact. Projects were selected by a diverse review committee, including Artspace staff, representatives from the sponsoring agencies, and other community members.

Exhibitions realized to date include:
 Christopher Fennell: Tree Dome (2005–2006), a contemplative space made of foraged lumber
 DeWitt Godfrey: Pamplona (2006), one of three projects in Public Art Moving Site, giant rusty loops of sheet metal filling the Lot's Orange Street gateway
 Micah Silver and Colby Brown: The Phoenix (2006), an installation of sounds found in New Haven
 June Bisantz Evans: Directions for Use (2006–2007), playful signs encouraging interaction
 Colin McMullan: A Lot in Our Lives (2007), interactive sculptures including outdoor libraries for books and objects This exhibition was home to McMullan's first Corner Library, a project which is ongoing at various locations in New York City.
 William Lamson: Long Shot (2009–2010), basketball court of massive proportions
 Siebren Versteeg and Paul Theriault, Particular Heights (2010–2011), a swing designed to measure joy
 Leeza Meksin: Flossing the Lot (2012) an installation featuring recycled printed spandex hung vertically against the walls of The Lot
 The Play House: Beyond What Was (2012) with Marianne Bernstein. Artists-in-residence worked within the transparent cube by day, interacting with the public. At night, the cube was wrapped, and the opaque surface became a projection screen.
 Polychromasia (2013), a retrospective exhibition (organized by Key Jo Lee) of paintings by Ficre Ghebreyesus

The Lot has also hosted two collaborations between esteemed artists and local high school students as part of Artspace's teen programs:

 Babel Collections with Carolyn Salas (2009)
 Tag & Repeat x 2 with Cat Balco (2010–2011)

In addition to the sponsors and partners listed above, the Lot has been supported by United Illuminating, the Berkshire Taconic Fund/Artists Resource Trust, Urban Resources Initiative, and CT Transit.

References

External Links 

 Artspace Records (ART 36), Robert B. Haas Family Arts Library Special Collections, Yale Library.

Contemporary art galleries in the United States
Buildings and structures in New Haven, Connecticut
Tourist attractions in New Haven, Connecticut
Art museums and galleries in Connecticut
1987 establishments in Connecticut
Art galleries established in 1987